Chả rươi (sand worm omelette) is a Vietnamese dish made from the polychaete worm Tylorrhynchus heterochaetus; it is a delicacy of some provinces in Northern Vietnam. The dish is prepared from live sand worms, which are put in hot water to remove their tentacles, and then mixed with raw egg. Onions and various spices are added, and the mixture is then fried until it obtains a crispy brown surface.

Because the sand worms can only be found in autumn, the dish is not available year round, and is considered a specialty during the autumn. Some vendors use frozen sand worms to be able to serve the dish year-round, but the taste of the fresh sand worms is considered superior. The sand worms are caught from mangroves in Hai Phong.

References

Vietnamese cuisine
Hanoi
Fried foods